Ken Matsui is a Japanese Greco-Roman wrestler. He won the gold medal in the 55 kg event at the 2021 World Wrestling Championships in Oslo, Norway.

References

External links 
 

Living people
Japanese male sport wrestlers
World Wrestling Championships medalists
2001 births
21st-century Japanese people